Sansha City is a prefecture-level city under the Hainan province of the People's Republic of China (PRC), and is the southernmost and least populated prefecture in China, with the smallest land area but the largest maritime territory. The city's seat is located on Yongxing Island in the South China Sea, and administers (actually or nominally) several island groups, atolls, seamounts and a number of other ungrouped maritime features within the nine-dash line, although the PRC's de facto control over the area varies.  The name "Sansha", literally meaning "three sands", refers to the three archipelago districts of Xisha, Zhongsha and Nansha.

Sansha was created on 24 July 2012, and administers a group of 260 islands, reefs and beaches located in the Spratly Islands (Nansha), Paracel Islands (Xisha), and Macclesfield Bank (Zhongsha Islands).  Reports in the China Daily stated that the establishment of Sansha was simply an upgrade of its administrative status from the previous county-level administration to prefecture-level. Subsequent developments have turned Sansha City (located on Xisha District's Yongxing Island) into a small town with over 1,400 residents, with a dual-use airport that has a  runway and two artificial harbors capable of docking sea vessels up to 5,000 tonnes.

Due to territorial disputes in the South China Sea, foreign reaction to the city's establishment was not positive.  The United States Department of State called the change in the administrative status "unilateral", and the move has received criticism from nations engaged in the South China Sea dispute, particularly the Philippines as well as Vietnam and the Republic of China (ROC, Taiwan), which claims the island.

Recent history 

In March 1953, as talks were proceeding with the French on the handing over of Hainan and territories south of Guangdong to the People's Republic of China, the Chinese State Council authorized the establishment of a separate "Guangdong Province Paracels, Spratlys, and Zhongsha Islands Authority" as a county-level administrative division on Woody Island (Yongxing Dao). However, the island continued to support a threadbare population of fisherfolk at that time. In March 1959,  this authority was upgraded to an administrative office in the name of "Guangdong Province Paracels, Spratlys, and Zhongsha Islands Revolutionary Committee". In October 1984, the administration of Sansha consisting of Yongxing Dao (Woody Island) and other islands in the South China sea was transferred to Hainan. This coincided with the establishment of Hainan as a separate administrative region. In September 1988, the authority's name was officially changed to the "Hainan Province Paracels, Spratlys, and Zhongsha Islands Authority". On 25 December 2006, Woody Island 'census-town's' first-ever "Residents' and Fishermen's Congress" was held. Three representatives at the township and village levels were selected to represent the census-town's Neighborhood Committee of the North and South Villages. The Neighborhood Committee began work on Woody Island the following day with an office at the Border Guards of the Paracels' Police Station. These were the first ever actual subdivisions created within the county-level authority.

The prospect of the establishment of a "city" on Woody Island was first publicized on 19 November 2007 in a report by Mingpao, a Hong Kong-based newspaper, through a telephone interview with a Mr. Zhang of the Propaganda Department of Wenchang, Hainan. This report claimed that a county-level city was to be established by the PRC State Council in November 2007 to administer three disputed archipelagos in the South China Sea: the Paracel Islands, Macclesfield Bank (Zhongsha Islands) and the Spratly Islands. This was to replace the county-level "Paracels, Spratlys, and Zhongsha Islands Authority". The city of Wenchang would provide supplies and logistics to the to-be-established city.

On 23 July 2012, the PRC Central Military Commission announced it had authorized the People's Liberation Army Guangzhou Military Command to form a "garrison command" in Sansha City. The troops would be responsible for managing the city's national defence mobilisation, military reserve, and carrying out military operations.

On 24 July 2012, the PRC officially established the city of Sansha in Yongxing Island.

Administrative divisions
Sansha City has two districts, Xisha District and Nansha District. Xisha District administers the Xisha and Zhongsha Islands and their surrounding waters, with the district government located on Yongxing Town. Nansha District administers the Nansha Islands and their surrounding waters, with the district government located on Yongshu Jiao.

Sansha is governed by a 
municipal congress of 60 delegates directly elected, with a standing committee of 15 members. It is further subdivided into 2 districts at county-level, 3 towns/management committees at the township-level, and further into 11 residential communities at village-level, based on the island groups:

Climate

Industries and facilities

The Sansha city has a registered population of 621 (as per 2020) and a resident population of around 1,800, in addition to an unknown number of military garrison personnels.  They tend to practice fishing, and selling products to the occasional cruise ship (MV Qionghai 3 and MV Sansha 1) whose tourists visit the island.  In November 2016, the Hainan government started to allow large companies to register themselves in Sansha, by providing extensive tax benefits to them.  This resulted in 157 large national and multinational companies registering themselves in Sansha.

In 2016, a government school and a public library were opened in the island, primarily for children of the islanders. In the same year, a desalinating plant was established to provide drinking water to the island's residents.

In practice, only the Yongxing Island Airport see scheduled commercial services, onboard Boeing 737 operated by Hainan Airlines. The other airports are for military use only.

Initiatives

"Greening the islands"
The second stage of a greening project for Sansha was announced on 30 June 2014. It states: "According to the investment plan, 18 million yuan (about 2.92 million U.S. dollars) will be used to build desalination systems and grow trees on Xishazhou Island (West Sand - NW Crescent Group) in the hope of turning the island into a new oasis."  The article makes references to the greening of:
Ganquan Island (Robert Island) - W Crescent Group between Antelope Reef and Pattle Island, where an environmental protection station was set up in February 2014
Jinqin (Drummond Island) - E Crescent Group
Lingyangjiao (Antelope Reef) - W Crescent Group between Money and Robert Islands
Xishazhou Island (West Sand) - NW Crescent Group
Yagong Island - NE Crescent Group, between Tree Island and Observation Bank
Yinyu (Observation Bank / Silver Islet) - NE Crescent Group
Yongxing Island (Woody Island) - Centre of Amphitrite group
Zhaoshu (Tree Island) - N Crescent Group
It also mentions substantial infrastructure upgrades to Woody Island, including waste-water treatment, garbage aggregation and treatment, desalination (1 million litres/day) and upgrades to photovoltaic equipment.

Controversy and protests
Because Sansha's jurisdiction comprises island groups that several nations besides the PRC claim as their own, the "city" is considered by some as controversial.

In 2007, the Foreign Ministry of Vietnam protested against the city's proposed establishment, which had been recently approved by the PRC's State Council, as Vietnam claims two of the three island groups that comprise Sansha. This was later followed by student demonstrations at the Chinese embassy in Hanoi, and at a consulate in Ho Chi Minh City.

Days prior to the official establishment of the city in late July 2012, Vietnam again stated its opposition and was joined in its protests by the Philippines. The United States Department of State also weighed in on the issue stating, "we remain concerned should there be any unilateral moves of this kind that would seem to prejudge an issue." The chair of the US Senate Foreign Relations East Asian and Pacific Affairs Subcommittee, Jim Webb, also made a statement regarding Sansha and questioned whether the city's creation was a violation of international law. While Senator Webb stated that the establishment of Sansha was China "creating a governmental system out of nothing", the Chinese government has included the island groups that comprise Sansha in its administrative structure since 1959. Before these island groups were under the nominal administration of Sansha, they were nominally administered by an administrative office under the provincial government of Hainan.

Western reaction to the 2012 declaration of the Chinese government elevating the administrative status of Sansha was not positive. The United States Department of State called the change in the administrative status of the territory "unilateral", and the move has received criticism from nations engaged in the South China Sea dispute, particularly the Philippines and Vietnam.

The centre of government for Sansha is located on Woody Island (Yongxing Dao) in the Paracels, where about 1,000 Chinese (PRC) reside. With a land area of 210ha, Woody Island is the largest contiguous land area in the South China Sea. Nationally, Sansha is the smallest prefecture-level city, by both population and land area, but the largest by total area, and is also the southernmost prefecture-level city of the PRC.

By January 2016, work was well advanced on developing a military base with a large harbour and a  runway, with the reclaimed land covering . A civilian test flight to the runway was conducted by a China Southern Airlines passenger jet on 13 July 2016. On 16 February 2016, the New York Times reported that China had deployed HQ‑9 surface‑to‑air missiles on the island.

In late 2016, photographs emerged which suggested that Mischief Reef was armed with anti-aircraft weapons and a CIWS missile-defence system. In May 2018, the Centre for Strategic and International Studies, a US think tank, said satellite images showed China had deployed new military weapon platforms to Woody Island, the largest of the Paracels.

See also

 Administrative divisions of the People's Republic of China
 South China Sea Islands
 James Shoal
 Macclesfield Bank
 Paracel Islands
 Scarborough Shoal
 Spratly Islands
 Territorial disputes in the South China Sea
 Kalayaan, Palawan, Philippines
 Trường Sa, Khánh Hòa, Vietnam

Notes

References

External links
 Sansha Government  
 Administrative divisions of Hainan Province
 Hainan Province Paracels, Spratlys, and Zhongsha Islands Authority
 Hainan Province Paracels, Spratlys, and Zhongsha Islands Authority Woody Island Census Town
 Subdivision Information of the Hainan Province Paracels, Spratlys, and Zhongsha Islands Authority
 US criticises China garrison
 Sansha City in China's South China Sea Strategy: Building a System of Administrative Control 

 
2012 establishments in China
States and territories established in 2012
Prefecture-level divisions of Hainan